Paulita may refer to:
 Paulita (crustacean), a genus of crustaceans in the family Inachoididae
 Paulita (plant), a genus of plants in the family Apiaceae
 Paulita, feminine forename
 Paulita Sedgwick (1943–2009), artist, actress